Natividad 'Naty' Rozario is a former Hong Kong international lawn bowler.

Rozario won a bronze medal in the triples at the 1988 World Outdoor Bowls Championship in Auckland with Rae O'Donnell and Sandra Zakoske.

She also won a bronze medal in the fours at the 1990 Commonwealth Games in Auckland with Jenny Wallis, Angela Chau and Yee Lai Lee.

References

Hong Kong female bowls players
Living people
Date of birth missing (living people)
Commonwealth Games medallists in lawn bowls
Commonwealth Games bronze medallists for Hong Kong
Year of birth missing (living people)
Bowls players at the 1990 Commonwealth Games
Medallists at the 1990 Commonwealth Games